Leiolopisma alazon, also known as the Lauan ground skink or Ono-i-Lau ground skink, is a species of skink found on Lau Islands of Fiji. The species is currently critically endangered due to a rise of the yellow crazy ant and rats on the islands.

References

Leiolopisma
Reptiles of Fiji
Endemic fauna of Fiji
Reptiles described in 1985
Taxa named by George Robert Zug